Hank M. Bounds, Ph.D., (born 1967) is an educator and the previous president of the University of Nebraska, where he was the administrator for the four campuses in the university. He has announced that he would step down from this position later in the summer of 2019 and return to the South with his family. He previously served as the commissioner of higher education in Mississippi.

Early life
Bounds grew up on a small farm in rural Mississippi, where his family raised pigs and cows and he hauled hay. His service in the Army National Guard helped him pay for college. Bounds earned his bachelor's degree in Sports Administration and Secondary Education in 1991 and his master's degree in Educational Administration in 1994, both from the University of Southern Mississippi. He earned a doctorate in Educational Leadership from the University of Mississippi in 2000.

Current work
On January 12, 2015, the Board of Regents unanimously appointed Hank M. Bounds, Ph.D., as the seventh president of the University of Nebraska. Bounds began his tenure as president on April 13, 2015. The University of Nebraska is the state's only public university. It was founded in 1869 in Lincoln, Nebraska, and currently has a total enrollment of over 51,200 students. Bounds announced departure of his service with the University of Nebraska system March 25, 2019.  On May 30, 2019, the University of Nebraska announced that Bounds would be succeeded by Susan Fritz, who will serve in an interim capacity until a permanent replacement is found

Other career highlights
Bounds began his career as a high school teacher, then rose to principal, and superintendent before becoming State Superintendent of Education in Mississippi. As chief state school academic officer for Mississippi, he oversaw an annual student enrollment of 495,000 students, an operating budget of more than $4.3 billion, and staff numbering 62,000. In his tenure as state superintendent, Bounds generated more than $49 million in private donations for the Mississippi Department of Education and local school districts. He led the effort to reopen all of the state’s public school districts within six weeks after approximately $1 billion in damage from Hurricane Katrina.

Bounds led the nation’s first successful state takeover of a local school district, and was appointed by Governor Haley Barbour as Chairman of the Education Committee for the Governor’s Commission on Recovery, Rebuilding, and Renewal. He also served as one of four Chief State School Officers on the national re-authorization task for the Elementary and Secondary Education Act—commonly known as “No Child Left Behind.”

Bounds became Mississippi’s commissioner of higher education in 2009. In that role, he oversaw a system of eight public universities including research universities, regional universities, an academic health science center, historically black institutions, a law center, a school of veterinary medicine and 200 institutes and centers. Together the system enrolled 85,000 students, employed 26,000 faculty and staff, and operated with a combined annual budget of $4.5 billion, including $500 million in research and development. During every year of Bounds’ tenure as commissioner, student enrollment and degrees awarded by the institutions in the Mississippi system increased, by a total of 13.3 percent and 11.4 percent, respectively.

In collaboration with the Board of Trustees, Bounds implemented a performance-based allocation model that distributed funds equitably and rewarded universities for achieving attainment outcomes. He designed an efficiencies plan that saved more than $90 million, an internal audit function, and a comprehensive diversity initiative that led to increased diversity among Mississippi faculty, staff and students.

His most notable oversight pertains to the Turning Point USA incident on the University of Nebraska-Lincoln campus in Aug. 2017, which attracted national debate.

Awards, honors, community service
In 2011, Bounds was asked by the business community to chair Blueprint Mississippi, a statewide initiative to bring together diverse perspectives and create an action strategy for the state. The project was funded by the private sector in cooperation with the Mississippi Economic Council, Mississippi Partnership for Economic Development and Momentum Mississippi.

In 2008 he was named as the Distinguished Alumnus of the Year from the School of Education and Psychology at the University of Southern Mississippi. He received the David W. Berlin Advocacy Award from the National Association of Gifted Children in 2007, and the Health Education Award for outstanding leadership and commitment to health awareness and education in Mississippi’s public schools from the Mississippi Health Awareness Committee. In 2003, he was named the Alumnus of the Year by the School of Education at the University of Mississippi. During his time in the Army, Bounds received Soldier of the Year for the Mississippi Army National Guard, Installation Support Unit in 1989.

Personal and family
Bounds and his wife, Susie, are the parents of a son, Will, and a daughter, Caroline.

References

Living people
People from Lincoln, Nebraska
Presidents of the University of Nebraska System
1967 births
University of Southern Mississippi alumni
University of Mississippi alumni